Gibbes House may refer to:

 Robert Gibbes House, Charleston, South Carolina, USA
 William Gibbes House, Charleston, South Carolina, USA

See also
 House (disambiguation)
 Gibbes (disambiguation)
 Gibbs House (disambiguation)